Youngimonas is a Gram-negative, strictly aerobic, rod-shaped, non-spore-forming and non-motile genus of bacteria from the family of Rhodobacteraceae with one known species (Youngimonas vesicularis). Youngimonas vesicularis has been isolated from seawater from the coast of Kending in Taiwan.

References

Rhodobacteraceae
Bacteria genera
Monotypic bacteria genera